Mirante do Vale Building (Portuguese: Condomínio Mirante do Vale, loosely translated as Overlook of the Valley Condominium), commonly called Mirante do Vale, is a 170-metre (558 ft) office skyscraper located in São Paulo, Brazil, in the area of Downtown São Paulo and Vale do Anhangabaú. Constructed from 1959 to 1960, it is the tallest building in São Paulo, and it was also the tallest in Brazil until 2014 when it was surpassed by Millennium Palace in Balneário Camboriú, Santa Catarina.

Construction
The building was built and designed by structural engineer Waldomiro Zarzur and architect Aron Kogan.

History
Designed by engineer Waldomiro Zarzur with Aron Kogan, the Mirante do Vale is located in the region of Vale do Anhangabaú, having access via three entrances, one on Prestes Maia Avenue, another on Pedro Lessa Square, and another on Brigadeiro Tobias Street. The construction of the skyscraper took two years. Waldomiro was an engineer with considerable experience. His first work, a house at Afonso Brás Street, Vila Nova Conceição, was performed when he was just 21 and still studying engineering at Mackenzie. At that time, the friendship with fellow student Aron Kogan became a society - which lasted until 1960, when Kogan was murdered Waldomiro took over the company.

It's possible to have an aerial view of Vale do Anhangabaú by visiting the observatory of the Altino Arantes Building or of the Edifício Itália, places that seem to be higher. It can also be seen from Viaduto do Chá and Viaduto Santa Efigênia, the latter well in front of the building. During certain periods, the concrete lattice structure at top of the building supported large neon signs advertising various brands, such as Fanta and Sharp, among others.

The building was known as the Palácio Zarzur Kogan (Zarzur Kogan Palace) until 1988.  Being located in a valley, Mirante do Vale sits on a lower part of the city compared to the other two and is, therefore, perceived as being lower than other buildings in the city, such as the Edifício Itália or the Altino Arantes Building. Another factor that contributes to the relative lack of knowledge of people towards the building is that it is closed for public visitation, although access to the top can be granted by permission.

Observation
On top of Mirante do Vale, it is possible to observe the entire region of Downtown São Paulo and part of the Paulista Avenue, including buildings Itália and Altino Arantes.

A bird's eye view of Mirante do Vale is possible from the observation decks of either the Altino Arantes Building or the Edifício Itália.

See also

 List of tallest buildings in South America
 List of tallest buildings in Brazil
 List of tallest buildings in São Paulo

Sources

External links

  Official page
  Mirante do Vale in Emporis
  Mirante do Vale in SkyscraperPage
  Interesting data of Skyscraper
  Waldomiro Zarzur, the owner of the building

|-

|-

Office buildings completed in 1960
Skyscrapers in São Paulo
Central Zone of São Paulo
Skyscraper office buildings in Brazil